Shoulderblade is an unincorporated community located in Breathitt County, Kentucky, United States.

It is reportedly named after a creek, a tributary of the Middle Fork of the Kentucky River.  The creek was in turn named for a bone of very large animal once discovered on its banks.  The community is also referred to as Juan, named after the Battle of San Juan Hill.

References

Unincorporated communities in Breathitt County, Kentucky
Unincorporated communities in Kentucky